Rang Nuwk Hum is a worship place for the Tangsa people of Northeast India and Myanmar. "Rang" means the God, "Nuwk" means pray and "Hum" means a small house that contain a picture of the God Rangfrah. 

Rangfrah is believed to be an incarnation of the Hindu god Shiva. Devotees go to a Rang Nuwk Hum everyday to give offerings and to pray which is followed by singing local bhajans.

References

External links
 Peoples of the Buddhist World, By Paul Hattaway
 Religion and Culture of North-Eastern India, By Raghuvir Sinha

Hindu temples in Arunachal Pradesh